Enkel Zhuti is an Albanian male ballet dancer. He has a career in ballet in Italy where he has been part of a ballet troupe in Milan.

References

Albanian male ballet dancers
Albanian expatriates in Italy
Living people
Year of birth missing (living people)